Anchampeedika is a town in the Kannur district of the North Malabar region in the Indian state of Kerala. Anchampeedika is located roughly 13.5 km from the Kannur Corporation, and it is adjacent to the Taliparamba municipality.

Geography
Anchampeedika is located at a significant location between Kannur, Taliparamba and Cherukunnu.

Anchampeedika shares borders with Morazha to the north, Kalliasseri to the south, Cherukunnu and Kannapuram to the west,  and Dharmasala to the east.

Etymology
The name Anchampeedika means "Fifth Shop." The town has seen tremendous growth since 2010. The town has been a nexus of political, social and economic reforms.

History
Anchampeedika was previously under Kolathiri rule. Later, Tipu Sultan adjoined this area as part of the Kingdom of Mysore. During British Raj, the kingdom was under Chirakkal Taluk of Malabar District in the Madras Presidency. After the formation of the Kerala State, this area was made brought under the Kalliasseri panchayat in the Cannanore District.

Demographics
According to the 2011 India Census, Anthoor had a population of 36,290, with 17,154 men and 19,136 women.

Anthoor was a panchayath consisting of two small villages, Morazha and Anthoor. In 1990, when the government of Kerala announced new municipalities, Anthoor Panchayat was merged with Taliparamba to form the new Municipality of Taliparamba. Later, in 2015, the government separated Anthoor from Taliparamba and made it an independent municipality. Anthoor is a municipality by its population and density, but maintains with the characteristics of a small village. The village is located on NH-17, situated near Taliparamba in the Kannur District of the North Malabar region in Kerala.

Administration
 District: Kannur
 Taluk/Tehsil: Taliparamba
 Municipality: Andur
 Block: Taliparamba
 Assembly constituency: Taliparamba
 Lok Sabha constituency : Kannur
 Police Station: Kannapuram
 Nearest Railway Station: Kannapuram

Post offices
Anchampeedika-670331

Tourism 
 Vellikkeel Eco Tourism Park

Other places of interests
Neeliyar Kottam (Near Kannur University Main Campus)
Ozhacrome Temple Pond
Paddy Fields of Morazha and Kanool
Scenic beauty of Punnakulangara
Hills at Morazha, Muthuvani and Mayilaadu

Institutions
 Institute of Co-operative Management, Parassinikkadavu
 Parrasianikkadavu Ayurveda Medical College
 Mangattuparambu Doordarshan Station
 Govt Engineering College, Kannur
 National Institute of Fashion Technology, Kannur
 Kendriya Vidyalaya Keltron Nagar
 KELTRON, Kannur
 Kerala Clays and Ceramic Products Limited
 Kannur University Main Campus

Religious Institutions
 Kalliasseri Vattakil Sree Muchilottu Bhagavathi Temple
 Kandamthalli Sreekrishna Temple
 Parakkoth Temple
 Morazha Shiva Temple
 Anchampeedika Juma Masjid

Governance
Member of the Legislative Assembly (India) - Mr. T. V. Rajesh

Member of Parliament - Mrs. P.K.Sreemathy Teacher

Transport
The national highway (NH-66) passes through Kalliasseri, which is about 2 km from the town. Mangalore and Mumbai can be accessed on the northern side, and Cochin and Thiruvananthapuram can be accessed on the southern side. Regional connectivity between Anchampeedika to Kannur, Taliparamba and Cherukunnu exists through private buses plying on these routes. The nearest railway stations are Kannapuram and Pappinisseri on the Mangalore-Palakkad line. The Kannur International Airport is at a distance of approximately 38 km from the town.

References

Villages near Dharmashala, Kannur